State Highway 61 (SH‑61) is a   north-south state highway located in extreme eastern Bear Lake County, Idaho, United States, that connects Wyoming Highway 89 (WYO 89) at the Idaho-Wyoming state line with U.S. Route 89 in Idaho (US 89) east of Geneva.

Route description
SH‑61 begins at the Wyoming state line at the north end of WYO 89.

Major intersections

See also

 List of state highways in Idaho

References

External links

 Idaho State Highways
 ID 61 - US 89 to WYO 89/Wyoming State Line

Transportation in Bear Lake County, Idaho
061
State highways in the United States shorter than one mile